The Judo at the 1987 Southeast Asian Games was held between 11 September to 15 September at Senayan Sports Complex.

Medal summary

Men

Women

Medal table

References
 http://eresources.nlb.gov.sg/newspapers/Digitised/Article/straitstimes19870912-1.2.44.15.15
https://news.google.com/newspapers?nid=x8G803Bi31IC&dat=19870912&printsec=frontpage&hl=en
 http://eresources.nlb.gov.sg/newspapers/Digitised/Article/straitstimes19870914-1.2.43.35
 http://eresources.nlb.gov.sg/newspapers/Digitised/Article/straitstimes19870915-1.2.50.28
 https://eresources.nlb.gov.sg/newspapers/Digitised/Article/straitstimes19870916-1.2.46.13.12.aspx

1987 Southeast Asian Games
Asian Games, Southeast
1987
1987 Asian Games, Southeast